The Fountain of Youth is a mythical spring which allegedly restores the youth of anyone who drinks or bathes in its waters. Tales of such a fountain have been recounted around the world for thousands of years, appearing in the writings of Herodotus (5th century BC), in the Alexander romance (3rd century AD), and in the stories of Prester John (early Crusades, 11th/12th centuries AD). Stories of similar waters also featured prominently among the people of the Caribbean during the Age of Exploration (early 16th century); they spoke of the restorative powers of the water in the mythical land of Bimini. Based on these many legends, explorers and adventurers looked for the elusive Fountain of Youth or some other remedy to aging, generally associated with magic waters. These waters might have been a river, a spring or any other water-source said to reverse the aging process and to cure sickness when swallowed or bathed in.

The legend became particularly prominent in the 16th century, when it became associated with the Spanish explorer Juan Ponce de León, the first Governor of Puerto Rico. Ponce de León was supposedly searching for the Fountain of Youth when he traveled to Florida in 1513. Legend has it that Native Americans told Ponce de León that the Fountain of Youth was in Bimini.

Early accounts
Herodotus mentions a fountain containing a special kind of water in the land of the Macrobians, which gives the Macrobians their exceptional longevity.

A story of the "Water of Life" appears in the Eastern versions of the Alexander romance, which describes Alexander the Great and his servant crossing the Land of Darkness to find the restorative spring. The servant in that story is in turn derived from Middle Eastern legends of Al-Khidr, a sage who appears also in the Qur'an. Arabic and Aljamiado versions of the Alexander Romance were very popular in Spain during and after the period of Moorish rule, and would have been known to the explorers who journeyed to America. These earlier accounts inspired the popular medieval fantasy The Travels of Sir John Mandeville, which also mentions the Fountain of Youth as located at the foot of a mountain outside Polombe (modern Kollam) in India. Due to the influence of these tales, the Fountain of Youth legend was popular in courtly Gothic art, appearing for example on the ivory Casket with Scenes of Romances (Walters 71264) and several ivory mirror-cases, and remained popular through the European Age of Exploration.

European iconography is fairly consistent, as the Cranach painting and mirror-case  Fons Juventutis (The Fountain of Youth) from 200 years earlier demonstrate: old people, often carried, enter at left, strip, and enter a pool that is as large as space allows. The people in the pool are youthful and naked, and after a while they leave it, and are shown fashionably dressed enjoying a courtly party, sometimes including a meal.

There are countless indirect sources for the tale as well. Eternal youth is a gift frequently sought in myth and legend, and stories of things such as the philosopher's stone, universal panaceas, and the elixir of life are common throughout Eurasia and elsewhere.

An additional inspiration may have been taken from the account of the Pool of Bethesda where a paralytic man was healed in the Gospel of John. In the possibly interpolated , the pool is said to be periodically stirred by an angel, upon which the first person to step into the water would be healed of whatever afflicted them.

Bimini

According to legend, the Spanish heard of Bimini from the Arawaks in Hispaniola, Cuba, and Puerto Rico. The Caribbean islanders described a mythical land of Beimeni or Beniny (whence Bimini), a land of wealth and prosperity, which became conflated with the fountain legend. By the time of Ponce de Leon, the land was thought to be located northwest towards the Bahamas (called la Vieja during the Ponce expedition). The natives were probably referring to the area occupied by the Maya. This land also became confused with the Boinca or Boyuca mentioned by Juan de Solis, although Solis's navigational data placed it in the Gulf of Honduras. It was this Boinca that originally held a legendary fountain of youth, rather than Bimini itself. Sequene, an Arawak chief from Cuba, purportedly was unable to resist the lure of Bimini and its restorative fountain. He gathered a troupe of adventurers and sailed north, never to return.

During outgoing tides, these channels pump cool, mineral-laden fresh water into the pool. Because this well was carved out of the limestone rock by ground water thousands of years ago it is especially high in calcium and magnesium. Magnesium, which has been shown to improve longevity and reproductive health, is present in large quantities in the sea water. While it is not known whether any legend about healing waters was widespread among the indigenous peoples of the Caribbean, the Italian-born chronicler Peter Martyr attached such a story drawn from ancient and medieval European sources to his account of the 1514 voyage of Juan Diaz de Solis in a letter to the Pope in 1516, though he did not believe the stories and was dismayed that so many others did.

Ponce de León

In the 16th century the story of the Fountain of Youth became attached to the biography of the conquistador Juan Ponce de León. As attested by his royal charter, Ponce de León was charged with discovering the land of Beniny. Although the indigenous peoples were probably describing the land of the Maya in Yucatán, the nameand legends about Boinca's fountain of youthbecame associated with the Bahamas instead. However, Ponce de León did not mention the fountain in any of his writings throughout the course of his expedition.

The connection was made in Gonzalo Fernández de Oviedo y Valdés's Historia general y natural de las Indias of 1535, in which he wrote that Ponce de León was looking for the waters of Bimini to regain youthfulness. Some researchers have suggested that Oviedo's account may have been politically inspired to generate favor in the courts. A similar account appears in Francisco López de Gómara's Historia general de las Indias of 1551. In the Memoir of Hernando d'Escalante Fontaneda in 1575, the author places the restorative waters in Florida and mentions de León looking for them there; his account influenced Antonio de Herrera y Tordesillas' unreliable history of the Spanish in the New World. Fontaneda had spent seventeen years as an Indian captive after being shipwrecked in Florida as a boy. In his Memoir he tells of the curative waters of a lost river he calls "Jordan" and refers to de León looking for it. However, Fontaneda makes it clear he is skeptical about these stories he includes, and says he doubts de León was actually looking for the fabled stream when he came to Florida.

Herrera makes that connection definite in the romanticized version of Fontaneda's story included in his Historia general de los hechos de los Castellanos en las islas y tierra firme del Mar Oceano. Herrera states that local caciques paid regular visits to the fountain. A frail old man could become so completely restored that he could resume "all manly exercises … take a new wife and beget more children." Herrera adds that the Spaniards had unsuccessfully searched every "river, brook, lagoon or pool" along the Florida coast for the legendary fountain.

Fountain of Youth Archaeological Park

The city of St. Augustine, Florida, is home to the Fountain of Youth Archaeological Park, a tribute to the spot where Ponce de León was supposed to have landed according to promotional literature, although there is no historical or archaeological evidence to support the claim. There were several instances of the property being used as an attraction as early as the 1860s; the tourist attraction in its present form was created by Luella Day McConnell in 1904. Having abandoned her practice as a physician in Chicago and gone to the Yukon during the Klondike gold rush of the 1890s, she purchased the Park property in 1904 from Henry H. Williams, a British horticulturalist, with cash and diamonds, for which she became known in St. Augustine as "Diamond Lil".

Around the year 1909 she began advertising the attraction, charging admission, and selling post cards and water from a well dug in 1875 for Williams by Philip Gomez and Philip Capo. McConnell later claimed to have "discovered" on the grounds a large cross made of coquina rock, asserting it was placed there by Ponce de León himself. She continued to fabricate stories to amuse and appall the city's residents and tourists until her death in a car accident in 1927.

Walter B. Fraser, a transplant from Georgia who managed McConnell's attraction, then bought the property and made it one of the state's most successful tourist attractions. The first archaeological digs at the Fountain of Youth were performed in 1934 by the Smithsonian Institution. These digs revealed a large number of Christianized Timucua burials. These burials eventually pointed to the Park as the location of the first Christian mission in the United States. Called the Mission Nombre de Dios, this mission was begun by Franciscan friars in 1587. Succeeding decades have seen the unearthing of items which positively identify the Park as the location of Pedro Menéndez de Avilés's 1565 settlement of St. Augustine, the oldest continuously inhabited European settlement in North America. The park currently exhibits native and colonial artifacts to celebrate Ponce de León and Pedro Menéndez de Avilés, the founder of St. Augustine. Exhibits of Timucua and Spanish heritage are also on display.

See also 
 Immortality
 Elixir of life
 Schiller Woods magic water pump

References

External links

 Fountain of Youth – St. Augustine, Florida
 Memoir of Hernando D'Escalante Fontaneda
 Article on the Fountain of Youth
 Article on Al-Khidr and the Water of Life
 Disney's Pirates of the Caribbean

Bimini
Florida folklore
Iconography
Longevity myths
Mythological objects
Recurring elements in folklore
Spanish Florida